Darvaz ( /), alternatively spelt Darwaz and Darvoz, may refer to the following:
 
Darvaz (region), a historic region in what is now Tajikistan and Afghanistan
Darvaz Range, Tajikistan 
Darvaz, Gilan, a village in Gilan Province, Iran
Darvoz district, in Tajikistan
Darwaz district, in Afghanistan
Nusay district, in Afghanistan

See also
Derweze (Darvaza), a village in Turkmenistan